Geoffrey Claeys (born 5 October 1974 in Bruges, Belgium) is a retired football player and currently manager of FC Kleit-Maldegem.

Biography
Claeys is a former Belgian international and was capped 10 times. He began his career at the Belgian club Cercle Brugge.  He left the club in 1996 for Dutch Feyenoord, then he made an unsuccessful move to R.S.C. Anderlecht and was transferred to K.S.C. Eendracht Aalst on loan.  He later played for Lierse and Royal Excelsior Mouscron, before moving to Melbourne Victory in 2005.  Although he enjoyed a solid season in the Victory defence, he rarely figured in the 06–07 season.
On 21 November 2006, Geoffrey Claeys retired from football. However, in 2007, he went to play for Torhout 1992 KM, in the Belgian Third Division. He retired soon after, however.

In 2009, he picked up football again, after his brother asked him to become his teammate at FC Veldegem. Veldegem plays in the provincial leagues of West Flanders.

References

External links
 Geoffrey Claeys Interview
 Career stats
 

1974 births
A-League Men players
Belgian Pro League players
Belgian footballers
Belgium international footballers
Cercle Brugge K.S.V. players
Eredivisie players
Feyenoord players
Lierse S.K. players
Living people
Melbourne Victory FC players
Footballers from Bruges
Royal Excel Mouscron players
R.S.C. Anderlecht players
S.C. Eendracht Aalst players
K.M.S.K. Deinze managers
Belgian expatriate footballers
Belgian expatriate sportspeople in Australia
Expatriate soccer players in Australia
Belgian expatriate sportspeople in the Netherlands
Expatriate footballers in the Netherlands
Association football defenders
Belgian football managers